Clear Creek is a stream in Johnson and Iowa counties, Iowa, in the United States. It is a tributary of Iowa River.

The name of Clear Creek originally referred to the clarity of its waters, which have since become muddied with the advent of intensive agriculture in the area.

See also
List of rivers of Iowa

References

Rivers of Iowa County, Iowa
Rivers of Johnson County, Iowa
Rivers of Iowa